The bar is a metric unit of pressure, but not part of the International System of Units (SI). It is defined as  exactly equal to 100,000 Pa (100 kPa), or slightly less than the current average atmospheric pressure on Earth at sea level (approximately 1.013 bar). By the barometric formula, 1 bar is roughly the atmospheric pressure on Earth at an altitude of 111 metres at 15 °C.

The bar and the millibar were introduced by the Norwegian meteorologist Vilhelm Bjerknes, who was a founder of the modern practice of weather forecasting, with the bar defined as one megadyne per square centimeter.

The International System of Units, despite previously mentioning the bar, now omits any mention of it. The bar has been legally recognised in countries of the European Union since 2004. The US National Institute of Standards and Technology (NIST) deprecates its use except for "limited use in meteorology" and lists it as one of several units that "must not be introduced in fields where they are not presently used". The International Astronomical Union (IAU) also lists it under "Non-SI units and symbols whose continued use is deprecated".

Units derived from the bar include the megabar (symbol: Mbar), kilobar (symbol: kbar), decibar (symbol: dbar), centibar (symbol: cbar), and millibar (symbol: mbar).

Definition and conversion 
The bar is defined using the SI derived unit, pascal:  ≡ 100,000 Pa ≡ 100,000 N/m2.

Thus,  is equal to:
 1,000,000 Ba (barye) (in cgs units);
and 1 bar is approximately equal to:
 
 
 
 
 
 1019.716 centimetres of water (cmH2O) (1 bar approximately corresponds to the gauge pressure of water (not absolute) at a depth of 10 meters).

Notes: 
 1 millibar (mbar) = 1 one-thousandth bar, or 
 1 millibar = 1 hectopascal (1 hPa = 100 Pa).

Origin 
The word bar has its origin in the Ancient Greek word , meaning weight. The unit's official symbol is bar; the earlier symbol b is now deprecated and conflicts with the use of b denoting the unit barn, but it is still encountered, especially as mb (rather than the proper mbar) to denote the millibar. Between 1793 and 1795, the word bar was used  for a unit of weight in an early version of the metric system.

Usage 

Despite the millibar not being an SI unit, meteorologists and weather reporters worldwide have long measured air pressure in millibars as the values are convenient. After the advent of SI units, some meteorologists began using hectopascals (symbol hPa) which are numerically equivalent to millibars; for the same reason, the hectopascal is now the standard unit used to express barometric pressures in aviation in most countries. For example, the weather office of Environment Canada uses kilopascals and hectopascals on their weather maps. In contrast, Americans are familiar with the use of the millibar in US reports of hurricanes and other cyclonic storms.

In fresh water, there is an approximate numerical equivalence between the change in pressure in decibars and the change in depth from the water surface in metres. Specifically, an increase of 1 decibar occurs for every 1.019716 m increase in depth. In sea water with respect to the gravity variation, the latitude and the geopotential anomaly the pressure can be converted into metres' depth according to an empirical formula (UNESCO Tech. Paper 44, p. 25).  As a result, decibars are commonly used in oceanography.

In scuba diving, bar is also the most widely used unit to express pressure, e.g. 200 bar being a full standard scuba tank, and depth increments of 10 metre of seawater being equivalent to 1 bar of pressure. 

Many engineers worldwide use the bar as a unit of pressure because, in much of their work, using pascals would involve using very large numbers. In measurement of vacuum and in vacuum engineering, residual pressures are typically given in millibar, although torr or millimeter of mercury (mmHg) were historically common.

Engineers that specialize in technical safety for offshore petrochemical facilities would be expected to exclusively refer to explosion loads in units of bars. A bar is a convenient unit of measure for pressures generated by low frequency vapor cloud explosions that are commonly considered as part of accidental loading risk studies.

In the automotive field, turbocharger boost is often described in bars outside the United States. Tire pressure is often specified in bars. In hydraulic machinery components are rated to the maximum system oil pressure, which is typically in hundreds of bars, for example 300 bars is common for industrial fixed machinery. 

Unicode has characters for "mb" and "bar", but they exist only for compatibility with legacy Asian encodings and are not intended to be used in new documents.

The kilobar, equivalent to 100 MPa, is commonly used in geological systems, particularly in experimental petrology.

"Bar(a)" and "bara" are sometimes used to indicate absolute pressures, and "bar(g)" and "barg" for gauge pressures. This usage is deprecated and fuller descriptions such as "gauge pressure of 2 bars" or "2-bar gauge" are recommended.

See also 
 Centimetre or millimetre of water
 
 List of metric units
 Metric prefix

References

External links 
Official SI website: Table 8. Non-SI units accepted for use with the SI
 US government atmospheric pressure map showing atmospheric pressure in mbar

Units of pressure
Non-SI metric units